Józef Piłsudski Park or Marshal Józef Piłsudski Park is the name of several in Poland dedicated to Józef Piłsudski:

Marshal Józef Piłsudski Park, Września
A part of Mokotów Field, Warsaw
 The largest park in Łódź
A park in Mława
A park in Rypin

See also
Józef Piłsudski's cult of personality